Giovanni di Stefano (1443 – c. 1506) was an Italian bronze-caster, engineer, and sculptor.  Baptized 20 June 1443, he was the son of Stefano di Giovanni.

Some of his surviving works include two angels in bronze at Siena Cathedral, which he created in 1489 in collaboration with Francesco di Giorgio (who also worked with Giacomo Cozzarelli on another pair of bronze angels in the same cathedral), the marble altar of St. Caterina's chapel in S. Domenico, Siena (1469), and the effigy of Cardinal Pietro Foscari in the church of Santa Maria del Popolo in Rome (previously thought to have been created by Vecchietta), which he created circa 1485. The latter is now preserved in the Costa Chapel.

Some scholars believe the bas relief of St. John the Evangelist in Siena Cathedral to also be the work of di Stefano, but the evidence for this is disputed.

References

Further reading

External links
 

1443 births
1506 deaths
15th-century Italian sculptors
Italian male sculptors